Iruraiz-Gauna is a municipality located in the province of Álava, in the Basque Country, northern Spain.

Geography

Administrative subdivisions 
Iruraiz-Gauna is divided into 11 villages, all of which are organized as concejos. Two parts of the municipality aren't integrated in any concejo: the Comunal de Ilarra and Orgazi.

Notes

References

External links
 IRURAIZ-GAUNA in the Bernardo Estornés Lasa - Auñamendi Encyclopedia 

Municipalities in Álava
1967 establishments in Spain